The Children's Museum of the Arts (“CMA”) is located at 103 Charlton Street, Manhattan, New York, United States in the South Village district.  Founded by Kathleen Schneider in 1988, CMA opened its new, 10,000-square-foot space in October 2011.

At CMA, kids ages 0–15 work with teaching artists to create art, including drawings, sculpture, sound art, textiles, and stop-motion animation. As part of its mission to promote art for all children, CMA features programs and partnerships designed for children with learning disabilities, children in foster care, and children in homeless families.

The museum maintains a collection of over 2,000 pieces of international children's art dating back to the 1930s from over 50 different countries.

Exhibitions
CMA's inaugural exhibition in its new facility is “Make Art (in) Public,” a survey of art in the public realm, which consists of sketches, photographs, models and pieces by Keith Haring, Christo and Jeanne-Claude, Friedensreich Hundertwasser, Tranqui Yanqui, and Swoon.

Past exhibitions include “Beyond the Refrigerator Door” in 2008, “The Black Book of Colors” in 2009, and “Art Within Reach: From WPA to the Present” in 2011. (‘Spare Times,” New York Times; “The Black Book of Colors Exhibition,” NY Art Beat; "‘Art Within Reach: From the WPA to the Present’ opens at the Children's Museum of the Arts,” Time Out New York).

Ian Berry's 'Secret Garden' in 2017 was a popular installation where he made a whole garden out of denim. The denim used was some of the last made in the USA. Ellen Harvey showed in 2017 with 'Ornaments and Other Refrigerator Magnets'.

Activities
The CMA provides art and creative expression programs for several groups of children and their families, including those with autism, families who are receiving preventive services, in foster care working toward reunification, children living in transitional housing, and for low-income teenage parents working to complete their public high school education.  These programs take place both at the museum and as outreach programs.

References

External links
 Children's Museum of the Arts - official site
 Link to permanent collection

Children's museums in New York City
Museums in Manhattan
Art museums and galleries in New York City
SoHo, Manhattan